Windsor Green is a hamlet in the civil parish of Cockfield, in the Babergh district of the county of Suffolk, England. It is about four miles away from the large village of Lavenham and about eleven miles away from the large town of Bury St Edmunds. For transport there is the A1141 road and the A134 road nearby.

References 
 Philip's Street Atlas Suffolk, 2007 edition. p. 64.

Hamlets in Suffolk
Cockfield, Suffolk